Never Too Late is the fourteenth studio album by English rock band Status Quo, coproduced by the group and John Eden. Released on 13 March 1981, it had been recorded at the same sessions – at Windmill Lane Studios, Dublin – as its predecessor Just Supposin'. It reached number 2 in the UK Albums Chart.

Only one single was released from the album: a cover of 'Something 'Bout You Baby I Like' (previously recorded by Tom Jones, and Glen Campbell with Rita Coolidge), backed with 'Enough Is Enough'. This was promoted with a music video directed by Godley and Creme. Towards the end of 1981, [[Rock 'n' Roll (Status Quo song)|a third single from ''Just Supposin]] was issued.

This was the last album to feature the 'frantic four' formation of the band as in late 1981 drummer John Coghlan departed the band, with Pete Kircher replacing him early the following year.

"With Never Too Late, we began to lose the plot," recalled singer Francis Rossi. "[Songwriter] Bob Young was cleverly promoted backwards. I've since learned that he was told the band didn't want him anymore."

Reception

AllMusic's retrospective review was mixed, criticizing the heavy dose of keyboards in the mix but praising most of the individual songs. They commented of the album and its twin, Just Supposin', that "Neither is what one would describe as a classic Quo disc, but nor are they as disposable as some of the band's later releases."

Track listingSide one "Never Too Late" (Francis Rossi, Bernie Frost) - 3:59
 "Something 'Bout You Baby I Like" (Richard Supa) - 2:51
 "Take Me Away" (Rick Parfitt, Andy Bown) - 4:49
 "Falling in Falling Out" (Parfitt, Bown, Bob Young) - 4:15
 "Carol" (Chuck Berry) - 3:41Side two "Long Ago" (Rossi, Frost) - 3:46
 "Mountain Lady" (Alan Lancaster) - 5:06
 "Don't Stop Me Now" (Lancaster, Bown) - 3:43
 "Enough is Enough" (Rossi, Parfitt, Frost) - 2:54
 "Riverside" (Rossi, Frost) - 5:04
2005 reissue bonus track

 "Rock 'N' Roll" (single version) (Rossi, Frost)

2017 Deluxe EditionDisc 1 "Never Too Late" (Francis Rossi, Bernie Frost)
 "Something 'Bout You Baby I Like" (Richard Supa)
 "Take Me Away" (Rick Parfitt, Andy Bown)
 "Falling in Falling Out" (Parfitt, Bown, Bob Young)
 "Carol" (Chuck Berry)
 "Long Ago" (Rossi, Frost)
 "Mountain Lady" (Alan Lancaster)
 "Don't Stop Me Now" (Lancaster, Bown)
 "Enough is Enough" (Rossi, Parfitt, Frost)
 "Riverside" (Rossi, Frost)Disc 2 "Rock N' Roll" (7" single version) (Rossi, Frost)
(Never Too Late Sampler - Austrian Flexi-Disc)
 "Don't Stop Me Now" (Lancaster, Bown)
 "What You're Proposing" (Rossi, Frost)
 LP Overview
 "Something 'Bout You Baby I Like" (Richard Supa)
 "Something 'Bout You Baby I Like" (acoustic instrumental demo) (Richard Supa)
(Live at St Austell Coliseum, Cornwall on 7 March 1981)
 "Caroline" (Rossi, Young)
 "Roll Over Lay Down" (Rossi, Parfitt, Lancaster, John Coghlan, Young)
 "Backwater" (Parfitt, Lancaster)
 "Little Lady" (Parfitt)
 "Don't Drive My Car" (Parfitt, Bown)
 "Whatever You Want" (Parfitt, Bown)
 "Hold You Back" (Rossi, Parfitt, Young)
 "Something 'Bout You Baby I Like" (Richard Supa)
 "Rockin' All Over The World" (John Fogerty)
 "Over The Edge" (Alan Lancaster, Keith Lamb)Disc 3'''
(Live at St Austell Coliseum, Cornwall on 7 March 1981)
 "Rock N' Roll" (Rossi, Frost)
 "Dirty Water" (Rossi, Young)
 "Forty-Five Hundred Times" (Rossi, Parfitt)
 "Big Fat Mama" (Rossi, Parfitt)
 "Don't Waste My Time" (Rossi, Young)
 "Roadhouse Blues" (Jim Morrison, John Densmore, Robby Krieger, Ray Manzarek)
 "Rain" (Parfitt)
 "Down Down" (Rossi, Young)
 "Bye Bye Johnny" (Chuck Berry)

Personnel 
Status Quo
Francis Rossi - guitar, vocals
Rick Parfitt - guitar, vocals
Alan Lancaster - bass
John Coghlan - drums

Additional personnel
Andy Bown - keyboards
Bernie Frost - backing vocals

Chart positions

Certifications

References

1981 albums
Status Quo (band) albums
Vertigo Records albums